Ancistrus krenakarore is a species of catfish in the family Loricariidae. It is a freshwater fish native to South America, where it occurs in the Itapacurá River, which is part of the Tapajós drainage in Brazil. The species was described in 2016 by Renildo R. de Oliveira, Lúcia H. Rapp Py-Daniel, Cláudio Henrique Zawadzki, and Jansen A. S. Zuanon on the basis of morphology and color patterning. FishBase does not list this species.

References 

krenakarore
Fish described in 2016